HNoMS Thrudvang was a monitor built for the Royal Norwegian Navy in 1869. She was scrapped in 1918, well after her muzzle-loading guns were outdated.
The slightly later  can be seen as an improvement of the Skorpionen class.

Details
 Thrudvang was armed with two heavy rifled muzzle-loaders in a revolving turret. She had five inches of iron armour on her deck, and her turret was protected by twelve inches of iron armour.

References

External links
 Naval History via Flix: KNM Skorpionen, retrieved 16 January 2006.
 Naval History via Flix: KNM Thrudvang, retrieved 16 January 2006

Monitors of the Royal Norwegian Navy
Ships built in Horten
1869 ships